Kurinjipadi block is a revenue block of the Cuddalore District of the Indian state of Tamil Nadu. This revenue block consist of 52 panchayat villages.

List of panchayat villages

References 

Revenue blocks of Cuddalore district